Hapoel Gvat/Yagur Basketball Club was a professional basketball team based in Gvat, Israel.
The club had a rich history in the Israeli Basketball Super League and in 1976 they became the first basketball club outside of Tel Aviv to win a title with a victory over Hapoel Tel Aviv in the finals of the Israeli Basketball State Cup. They also finished in the top division as runners up to Maccabi Tel Aviv in 1972, 1976 and in 1978.

Honours
Domestic Championship:
Runners-up (3): 1971-72, 1975–76, 1977–78
Israeli Basketball State Cup:
Winners (1): 1976
Runners-up (1): 1975

Notable players

Or Goren (born 1956)
 Albert Hemmo (born 1934)
Boaz Janay (born 1952)
 Ari Rosenberg (born 1964)
 Gabi Teichner (born 1945)
 Ofer Yaakobi (born 1961)

References

Defunct basketball teams in Israel
Basketball teams established in 1953
1953 establishments in Israel
Former Israeli Basketball Premier League teams
Basketball teams disestablished in 1996